Steven 'Steve' Santana (born 1981) is a Canadian lawn bowler.

Bowls career
Santana was the 2011 Canadian Singles Champion and represented Canada at the 2012 World Outdoor Bowls Championship.

He won a pairs gold medal with Ryan Bester at the 2015 Asia Pacific Bowls Championships in New Zealand.

References

1981 births
Living people
Canadian male bowls players
Sportspeople from Victoria, British Columbia